The Memories Do Not Open Tour was  a concert tour by The Chainsmokers, in support of the duo's debut studio album, Memories...Do Not Open (2017). The tour began in Miami on April 13, 2017, and ended on October 24, 2017, in Auckland.

Background and development 
On January 30, 2017, the duo announced they will be releasing their debut album, accompanied by an arena tour. Kiiara was announced as the opening act, with Emily Warren as a special guest during the Chainsmokers' set. They announced on Instagram that they would be taking a fan, Tony Ann, (a Berklee College of Music student) with them on the tour because they were impressed with his piano cover of their song "Paris".

Critical reception 
The tour received mixed reviews. One negative review from Miami, Zach Schlein simply said he was "not a fan". In an EDM Sauce review from Albany, Nick White described the production of the show as "something that has clearly been thought out for a long time." He also noted that the non-DJ parts of the show weren't the best saying "Andrew's vocals just don't do it for me", but complimenting the drummer and keyboard player calling them "the highlights of the band section with each of them getting a solo section and absolutely killing it". A Toronto review, Tashana Billey called it a "top-notch show" and "definitely worth checking out".

Tour dates

Cancelled shows

Notes

References 

2017 concert tours
The Chainsmokers